George Murdock (born George Sawaya Jr.; June 25, 1930 – April 30, 2012) was an American character actor, especially prolific on television.

Early years 
Murdock was born in Salina, Kansas.  He was the second child of seven children born to George R. Sawaya, a Lebanese immigrant, and Olive (Johnson) Sawaya.

Career 
Murdock was known for frequently playing judges, (for instance, Judge Julius Hoffman in West Coast and Chicago stage productions of The Chicago Conspiracy Trial and in an adaptation for BBC Radio), he also performed the role of "Big Daddy" in Tennessee Williams' Cat on a Hot Tin Roof with the Arizona Theater Company during the 1988 season. He was also Laszlo Gabo on the 1986–87 sitcom What a Country!.

Among his most well-known characters for movies and TV were Lt. Scanlon, the bitter and suspicious NYPD Internal Affairs officer in Barney Miller,  Dr. Salik in Battlestar Galactica TV series, "God" in Star Trek V: The Final Frontier, Admiral Hanson in the Star Trek: The Next Generation episode "The Best of Both Worlds", and as Yuri Testikov in the Seinfeld episode, "The Marine Biologist".

Death
On April 30, 2012, Murdock died of cancer in Burbank, California, at age 81.

Filmography

The Twilight Zone (Episode: "The Dummy") (1962, TV Series) as Willie
The Untouchables (1962, TV Series) as Pete Topchinski / Gus Dmytryk
Pressure Point (1962) as Rally Speaker (uncredited)
77 Sunset Strip (1963, TV Series) as Frank Syden
He Rides Tall (1964) as Burt
Taggart (1964) as Army Scout (uncredited)
Combat! (1965, TV Series) as Marcus
I Spy (1965, TV Series) as Mariner
Bonanza (1965-1970, TV Series) as Luis Getty / Marks / Floyd
Ben Casey (1965) as Byron B. Davis
The F.B.I. (1965-1974, TV Series) as Dirken / Vic Kirby / Al Evans
Tarzan (1966-1967, TV Series) as Eric / Damian / Karl
Gunn (1967) as Archie
Batman (1967) as one of Catwoman's henchmen
The Wild Wild West (1967, TV Series) as Luther Coyle
Gunsmoke (1967-1974, TV Series) as Luke / Cole Matson / Bret Gruber / Jim Travers
Ironside (1968-1974, TV Series) as Sheriff / Phil Wagner / Jim Peters / Lee R. Anderson / FBI Agent Torrence / Capt. Walter Finch / Victor Cramer
Blackbeard's Ghost (1968) as Head Official
Cimarron Strip (1968, TV Series) as Bladgey
The Virginian (1969, TV Series) as Barton
Night Gallery (1969, TV Series) as 1st Agent
It Takes a Thief (1970, TV series) as Devon
Hawaii Five-O (1971, TV Series) as Hank Merrill
The Mod Squad (1971, TV Series) as Price 
The Todd Killings (1971) as Police Officer
Adam-12 (1971, TV Series) as Mr. Williams
Bearcats! (1971, TV Series) as Coot Leonard
Banacek (1972-1974, TV Series) as Cavanaugh
McCloud (1972-1974, TV Series) as Sergeant Rosovitch / Officer Duncan
The Mack (1973) as Fatman
The New Perry Mason (1973, TV Series) as Sgt. Dave Cook
The Magician (1973, TV Series) as Timothy Dunagan
Willie Dynamite (1974) as Celli
Thomasine & Bushrod (1974) as U.S. Marshal Bogardie
The Six Million Dollar Man (1974, TV Series) as Rossi 
Hangup (1974) as Captain Gorney
Earthquake (1974) as Colonel
The Streets of San Francisco (1974-1977, TV Series) as Harlan Betts / Dempsey / Merle
The Invisible Man (1975, TV Series) as Captain Scopes
Police Woman (1975, TV Series) as Hogan / Macon
Barney Miller (1976-1982, TV Series) as Lt. Ben Scanlon
Little House on the Prairie (1977, TV Series) as Jeremy Stokes
Breaker! Breaker! (1977) as Judge Joshua Trimmings
Thunder and Lightning (1977) as Jake Summers
Lou Grant (1977, TV Series) as Sgt. Irwin Winowsky
The Rockford Files (1978, TV Series) as Doc Holliday
The Dukes of Hazzard (1979, TV Series) as Big Jim Downey
The Misadventures of Sheriff Lobo (1979-1981, TV Series) as Mr. Sheldon / Mayor Hawkins
Any Which Way You Can (1980) as Sgt. Cooley
Trapper John, M.D. (1981, TV Series) as Jobo's Dad
Shoot the Moon (1982) as French DeVoe
Bosom Buddies (1982, TV Series) as Elliot Pardo
T.J. Hooker (1982, TV Series) as Detective Jackson
The Sword and the Sorcerer (1982) as Quade
Hill Street Blues (1982, TV Series) as Buck Remington
Benson (1982, TV Series) as Officer George Grimsby
The Winds of War (1983) as Brig. Gen. 'Fitz' Fitzgerald
I'm Going to Be Famous (1983)
Knight Rider (1983-1984, TV Series) as Archibald / Judge Oliver Callan
Night Court (1984, TV Series) as Detective Griffin / Sergeant Foster / Hank Mire / Womack
Fame (1985, TV Series) as Mr. Pulaski
Certain Fury (1985) as Lt. Speier
Murder, She Wrote (1985, TV Series) as Officer Kaplan
Small Wonder (1986, TV Series) as Mr. Gordon
Retribution (1987) as Dr. John Talbot
Dynasty (1988, TV Series) as Charlie Braddock
Midnight Caller (1989, TV series) as Sam Chase 
War and Remembrance (1989, TV Mini-Series) as Gen. Leslie Groves
Star Trek V: The Final Frontier (1989) as The "God" entity
L.A. Law (1989, TV Series) as Sam
Star Trek: The Next Generation (1990, TV Series) as Admiral J. P. Hanson
Timescape (1992) as Judge Caldwell
Final Analysis (1992) as Judge Costello
Batman: The Animated Series (1992, TV Series) as Boss Biggis (voice)
Law & Order (1992-1999, TV Series) as Judge Eric Bertram
Lois & Clark: The New Adventures of Superman (1993, TV Series) as Burton Newcomb
Firepower (1993) as Captain Croy
Seinfeld (1994, TV Series) as Testikov
Plughead Rewired: Circuitry Man II (1994) as Senator Riley
Molly & Gina (1994) as Patrick Sweeny
The Nanny (1995, TV Series) as Dakota Williams
Tyson (1995, TV Movie) as Baranski
The American President (1995) as Congressman
Crosscut (1996) as Uncle Leo
Chicago Hope (1996, TV Series) as Judge John Spencer
ER (1996, TV Series) as Mr. Sidowski
The Gregory Hines Show (1997, TV Series) as Samuel Lawrence
Mike Hammer, Private Eye (1997, TV Series) as Cleve Baxter
Scorpio One (1998) as CIA Director Wilfrid Parlow
Early Edition (1998, TV Series) as Dutch Van Drie
Anarchy TV (1998) as Chief Cochon
Just Shoot Me! (1998, TV Series) as Sea Captain
Phoenix (1998) as Sid
The X-Files (1998-1999, TV Series) as Elder #2 / 2nd Elder
The X-Files: Fight the Future (1998) as 2nd Elder
The Adventures of Ragtime (1998) as Captain Murphy
The Norm Show (1999, TV Series) as Probation Officer
Family Tree (1999) as Big Wig
Battlestar Galactica: The Second Coming (1999, Short) as Dr. Salik
Time Share (2000) as Cedric Templeton
Judging Amy (2000-2002, TV Series) as Judge Norman Artel
2000x (NPR/Hollywood Theater of the Ear radio series)
Smallville (2001, TV Series) as Old Harry Bollston
Orange County (2002) as Bob Beugler
The Dead Zone (2002, TV Series) as Arthur Allen
Legend of the Phantom Rider (2002) as The Judge
Spider's Web (2002) as Robert Harding
Looney Tunes: Back in Action (2003) as Acme VP, Unfairly Promoted
Serial Killing 4 Dummys (2004) as Detective Ray Berro
CSI: Crime Scene Investigation (2005, TV Series) as Stuart Manslow
One More Round (2005) as Mr. Mack
Man in the Chair (2007) as Richard Butler
Say It in Russian (2007) as Warden
Eagleheart (2011, TV Series) as Fred
Torchwood: Miracle Day (2011, TV Series) as Preacher
Dispatch (2011) as Himself

References

External links

George Murdock at Memory Alpha, The Star Trek Wiki
Obituary

1930 births
2012 deaths
Deaths from cancer in California
Male actors from Kansas
American male film actors
American people of Lebanese descent
American male television actors
People from Salina, Kansas
20th-century American male actors
21st-century American male actors
American male stage actors